35th Army may refer to:

35th Army (Russia), a unit created during World War II, still in service
Thirty-Fifth Army (Japan), a unit of the Imperial Japanese Army